Classic Masters is a compilation album by Canadian rock band April Wine, released in 2002. The album cover is a reprint of the albums First Glance (1978) (American version only), The Hits (1987), and Greatest Hits (1979).

Track listing

Personnel

April Wine 
 Myles Goodwyn – lead vocals, guitar, keyboards
 Brian Greenway – vocals, rhythm guitar
 Gary Moffet – lead guitar, background vocals
 Steve Lang – bass, background vocals
 Jerry Mercer – drums, background vocals

Production 
 Myles Goodwyn – producer
 Nick Blagona – producer
 Mike Stone – producer
 Lance Quinn – producer
 Bryan Kelley – producer
 Cheryl Pawelski – producer, compilation

References 

April Wine albums
2002 greatest hits albums
Albums produced by Myles Goodwyn
Albums produced by Mike Stone (record producer)
Capitol Records compilation albums
MCA Records compilation albums
Albums produced by Nick Blagona